Hopea mindanensis is a species of plant in the family Dipterocarpaceae. It is endemic to the Mindanao islands region of the southern Philippines.

References

mindanensis
Endemic flora of the Philippines
Flora of Mindanao
Trees of the Philippines
Taxonomy articles created by Polbot

Endangered flora of Asia